Rosario de Tesopaco Municipality is a municipality in Sonora in north-western Mexico.

Area and population
The municipal area is 3,301.90 km2 with a population of 5,432 registered in 2000. The population of the municipal seat was 2,649 in 2000.  It is located at an elevation of 450 meters.

Neighboring municipalities
Neighboring municipalities are:
State of Chihuahua Yécora—northeast
Aconchi Municipality—east
Álamos Municipality—southeast
Quiriego Municipality—south
Cajeme Municipality—west

References

Municipalities of Sonora